John Suttie Smith (21 June 1905 – 23 January 1975) was a Scottish long-distance runner. He competed in the men's 10,000 metres at the 1928 Summer Olympics.

References

External links
 

1905 births
1975 deaths
Athletes (track and field) at the 1928 Summer Olympics
Scottish male long-distance runners
Olympic athletes of Great Britain
Sportspeople from Dundee